Arthur Shelby may refer to:

Arthur Shelby, character in Uncle Tom's Cabin
Arthur Shelby Snr, character in Peaky Blinders (TV series)
Arthur Shelby Jnr, character in Peaky Blinders (TV series)
Arthur Shelby (murderer), see List of people executed in Texas, 1870–79